Walter Bettridge (26 October 1886 – 23 December 1931) was an English footballer who made over 200 appearances for Chelsea. He was a "lightweight" right back who was "fearless in stopping forwards."

Club career
Bettridge had played for Burton United but in 1909 he joined Chelsea.  He was a member of the Chelsea side that reached the FA Cup final in 1915. He played in a total of 254 games for Chelsea (including FA Cup appearances). In June 1922, aged 36, he joined Gillingham of the Third Division South, where he spent one season, before moving on to Peterborough & Fletton United. He died in December 1931, aged 45.

Personal life 
Bettridge enlisted in January 1916 as an air mechanic in the Royal Flying Corps during the First World War. He trained as a fitter, and attained the rank of air mechanic 1st class. After serving in both the Royal Flying Corps and the Royal Air Force, Bettridge was demobilized in 1919.

References

English footballers
Chelsea F.C. players
Gillingham F.C. players
Peterborough & Fletton United F.C. players
1931 deaths
Burton United F.C. players
Royal Air Force personnel of World War I
Royal Flying Corps soldiers
1886 births
Association football fullbacks
British Army personnel of World War I
Royal Air Force airmen
FA Cup Final players